Mishawr Rawhoshyo  is a 2013 Indian adventure thriller film directed by Srijit Mukherji, based on the fictional character Kakababu created by Sunil Gangopadhyay. It stars Prosenjit Chatterjee, Indraneil Sengupta, Swastika Mukherjee, Aryann Bhowmik, and many others. The plot revolves around a hieroglyphic trail that leads the protagonist to Egypt and underneath a pyramid. The film became one of the biggest hits of 2013 and gained a strong cult following from the audience and critics. The second film of this Kakababu series Yeti Obhijaan was released in 2017. The third film, Kakababur Protyaborton, was released in 2022.

Plot
Mishawr Rawhoshyo starts with Kakababu (Prosenjit Chatterjee) and his nephew Shontu (Aryann Bhowmik) smiling after watching news informing of the imminent overthrow of the dictatorship in Egypt.

The film rewinds into a flashback. It is 2010. Kakababu is contracted by Egyptian businessman Al Mamun (Rajit Kapur) to decipher the meanings of hieroglyphic symbols that his teacher, Mufti Muhammad (Barun Chanda), had drawn on a piece of paper supposedly during his sleep. Muhammad is terminally ill and is about to grant his last wish while he is being treated in Delhi. Mamun thinks that the symbols are the key for locating Mufti Muhammad's will which will describe where to find treasures Mufti Muhammad had acquired during his tenure as a political leader and revolutionary. However, Kakababu is convinced that the symbols have a different meaning and they are very unusual. Mufti Muhammad symbolically requests Kakababu to verify something, a very unusual last wish.

Meanwhile, a war of rivalry ensues between Mamun and Hani Al Qadi (Indraneil Sengupta), another of Mufti Muhammad's disciples (and a rival of Mamun) who accuses Mamun of stealing a secret that isn't rightfully his. While in Delhi, there was an attempt to murder Kakababu, in which Kakababu was injured. Kakababu took the challenge to uncover the truth; he and his nephew Shontu head to Egypt where they are drawn into the vortex of the mystery.

Kakababu gets kidnapped by Al Qadi's men which sets off a chain of events, culminating in a climax under a pyramid. Inside the pyramid, Kakababu discovers the lost mummy of an Egyptian queen with the help of the hieroglyphics code written by Mufti Muhammad. The present-day political turmoil in Egypt subtly reverberates. At the end, Kakababu gives Hani Al Qadi the coded message written inside the coffin of the mummy and wishes him good luck for his upcoming revolution to free Egypt from the corrupt dictator Jashni Mubarak (fictionalized Hosni Mubarak).

Cast
 Prosenjit Chatterjee as Kakababu/Raja Roychowdhury. this was his third film with  Mukherjee  
 Aryann Bhowmik as Shontu/Sunanda Roychowdhury
 Indraneil Sengupta as Hani Al Qadi
 Rajit Kapur as Al Mamun
 Rajesh Sharma as CBI officer Narendra Verma
 Neel Mukherjee as Siddhartha
 Swastika Mukherjee as Snigdha
 Tridha Choudhury as Rini
 Barun Chanda as Mufti Mohammad (cameo appearance)
 Kamaleshwar Mukherjee as Sadat Manto (cameo appearance)
 Biswajit Chakraborty as Kakababu's elder brother/Sontu's father
 Indranath Mukherjee as Indranath Mukherjee at JNU

Development
Srijit Mukherji licensed the first three books in the Kakababu series with the intent to produce a film every other year starring Prosenjit Chatterjee as Kakababu, his only choice for the role. Filming took place in Cairo, Egypt and Delhi in early 2013, with Chatterjee stating that Mukherji was updating the character to be more contemporary. Chatterjee also commented that, although they had not changed Ganguly's character too much, that "lookwise he is a modern Kakababu."

The movie also features Rabindranath Tagore's famous poem Chitto Jetha Bhayshunyo.

Soundtrack

The soundtrack consists of six tracks composed by Indraadip Dasgupta with lyrics by Srijato. It was released on 2 October 2013 by the cast and crew in the Oberoi Grand Hotel in Kolkata.

Critical response

Reception 
Mishawr Rawhoshyo garnered mixed to generally positive reviews from critics.

Gautam Chakraborty of Anandabazar Patrika rated it .

Dippanita Mukhopadhay Ghosh of Ebela rated it .

Awards and nominations 
Filmfare Awards East::
Filmfare Award for Best Actor Supporting Role Male – Bengali - Indraneil Sengupta (Won)
Filmfare Award for Best Film – Bengali (Nominated)
Filmfare Award for Best Actor Male – Bengali - Prosenjit Chatterjee (Nominated)
Filmfare Award for Best Lyricist – Bengali - Srijato for Baalir Shawhor (Nominated)
Filmfare Award for Best Singer Female – Bengali - Shreya Ghoshal for Baalir Shawhor (Nominated)

Zee Bangla Gaurav Samman::
Zee Bangla Cinema Superhit Film of the Year (Nominated)
Best Director - Srijit Mukherji (Nominated)
Best Actor - Male - Prosenjit Chatterjee (Nominated)
Best Supporting Actor - Male - Indraneil Sengupta (Nominated)
Best Actor - Negative Role - Rajit Kapur (Nominated)
Best Music Director - Indradeep Dasgupta (Nominated)

Sequel
The sequel Yeti Obhijaan was released in 2017.
The second sequel Kakababur Protyaborton is scheduled to be released in October 2019.

References

External links
Official Facebook page

2013 films
2010s adventure films
Bengali-language Indian films
2010s Bengali-language films
Films scored by Indradeep Dasgupta
2010s thriller films
Indian children's films
Indian detective films
Films shot in Egypt
Films shot in Delhi
Films shot in Kolkata
Films based on Indian novels
Films directed by Srijit Mukherji
Films based on works by Sunil Gangopadhyay